Abdul Zubairu (born 3 October 1998) is a Nigerian professional footballer who plays as midfielder for Bosnian Premier League club Zrinjski Mostar.

Career
Zubairu made his Fortuna Liga debut for AS Trenčín against Slovan Bratislava on 25 February 2016.

Style of play
A dynamic and diminutive player, standing at just 1.65 m, Zubairu is known for his energy and ball-winning abilities as a box-to-box midfielder in the centre of the pitch. He is also capable as a playmaker, and has been likened to N'Golo Kanté.

References

External links
 AS Trenčín official club profile 
 
 Futbalnet Profile 

1998 births
Living people
Sportspeople from Kaduna
Nigerian footballers
Nigerian expatriate footballers
Association football midfielders
AS Trenčín players
Slovak Super Liga players
HŠK Zrinjski Mostar players
Premier League of Bosnia and Herzegovina players
Expatriate footballers in Slovakia
Expatriate footballers in Bosnia and Herzegovina
Nigerian expatriate sportspeople in Slovakia
Nigerian expatriate sportspeople in Bosnia and Herzegovina